Louis of Granada, OP (1504 – 31 December 1588), was a Dominican friar who was noted as theologian, writer and preacher. The cause for his canonization has been long open with the Holy See, with his current status being Venerable.

Biography 
Louis was born in Granada of poor parents named Sarria. At the age of nineteen he was received into the Dominican Order in the Priory of the Holy Cross in Granada.

When Louis had completed these studies, he embarked upon the career of a preacher, in which he continued with extraordinary success during forty years. The fame of his preaching spread beyond the boundaries of his native land, and at the request of the Cardinal-Infante, Dom Henrique of Portugal, son of King Manuel, he was transferred to Portugal, where he became Prior Provincial of the Portuguese Dominicans in 1557. His extraordinary sanctity, learning, and wisdom soon attracted the attention of the queen regent, who appointed him her confessor and counselor. The Bishopric of Viseu and the Archbishopric of Braga were successively offered to him only to be courteously, but firmly, refused. The honours of the cardinalate, offered to him by Pope Sixtus V, were also declined.

Besides ascetical theology, his published works treat of Scripture, dogma, ethics, biography and church history. He is best known, however, for his ascetical writings. Most of them were translated into many languages. The best known of his ascetical writings, and the one that achieved the greatest measure of success, is The Sinner's Guide (La Guia de Pecadores), published in 1555. It is marked by a smooth, harmonious style of purest Spanish idiom which has merited for it the reputation of a classic, and by an unctuous eloquence that has made it a perennial source of religious inspiration. It has been compared with Thomas à Kempis's The Imitation of Christ. Within a comparatively short time after its first appearance it was translated into Italian, Latin, French, German, Polish, and Greek. He earned much money for his writings, all of which went to the poor.

In 1539, at the age of 35, he wrote a small tract on the method of prayer for a student who had written to him for advice. This tract developed into his first book, The Book of Prayer and Meditation, published in 1554. The unexpected success of the book led him to dedicate himself to writing on spiritual themes for all. He led a life of an ascetic, his cell being poor and having few possessions. He wrote for 35 years, producing 49 works.

Louis died at the age of 84 at Lisbon, Portugal.

Works
Luis de Granada produced in total 45 works, in Spanish, Latin and Portuguese, comprising original works, as well as translations of others' works and revisions and additions to his own previously published works. Among the works authored by him are:
 Libro de la Oracion y Meditacion (The Book of Prayer and Meditation), (Salamanca: Andrés de Portonariis, 1554; revised, 1566)
 Memorial de la Vida Cristiana (A Memorial of a Christian life), 2 vols, (Lisbon, 1565).
 Guía de pecadores (The Sinner's Guide), 2 vols, (Lisbon, 1556, 1557) – available here (HTML version) or here (archive.org version).
 Introducción del símbolo de la fe, (Salamanca, 1584).
 Vida de Jesucristo: para conocer, amar e imitar a nuestro Señor.
 Vida de María: vida y misterio de la Santísima Virgen.
 Los seis libros de la Retórica Eclesiástica o Método de Predicar.
 Adiciones al Memorial de la Vida Cristiana.
 Compendio y Explicacion de la Doctrina Cristiana.
 Oracion al Glorioso Patriarca Sancto Domingo.
 Vida de fray Bartolome de los Martires.
 Trece sermones.

A collected edition of his works was published in 9 volumes at Antwerp in 1578.

Later reputation
A biography was written by L. Munoz, La Vida y virtudes de Luis de Granada (Madrid, 1639).

Rose of Lima's favorite book by Louis was The Book of Prayer and Meditation—a book that laments the miseries of life and manifests spiritual contempt for the world. Once, it was said, she banished the devil's temptations by reading this book, causing the devil to snatch the book from her and throw it onto a rubbish heap. Rose remained calm, certain that the Lord would return it to her, and she got it back.

Other famous Catholics who have read and loved the works of Louis of Granada include Vincent de Paul, Louise de Marillac, Francis de Sales, Cardinal Berulle and Jacques-Bénigne Bossuet (all French); Charles Borromeo (Italian), Louis of Leon (Spanish), and the Jesuit and Barnabite Orders. Teresa of Ávila read his books and commanded her nuns to do so.

Francis de Sales highly commended to a bishop-elect to have the whole works of Louis of Granada, and to regard them as a second breviary. He advised him to read them carefully, beginning with The Sinner's Guide. He said, "But to read him with fruit you must not run through him hastily ; he must be pondered, and have his full weight, and chapter after chapter must be mused upon and applied to the soul with much thought and prayer to God. You must read him with reverence and devotion, like a book containing the most useful inspirations man can receive from on high, and thereby reform all the powers of the soul."

References

External links
 
 University of Notre Dame Rare Books and Special Collections Books by Luis (Luys) de Granada

1505 births
1588 deaths
16th-century Christian mystics
People from Granada
Spanish Dominicans
16th-century Spanish Roman Catholic theologians
Spanish spiritual writers
16th-century Spanish Roman Catholic priests
Dominican mystics
16th-century venerated Christians